The 1991 Continental Airlines London Masters was a professional invitational snooker tournament, which took place from October 1990 to May 1991 at the Café Royal in London, England.

Steve Davis won the final edition of the tournament beating Stephen Hendry 4–0 in the final.

Main draw

References

London Masters (snooker)
1991 in snooker
1991 in English sport